Dino Gavrić (born 11 April 1989) is a Croatian retired footballer who last played for NK BSK Bijelo Brdo, as a central defender.

Club career
Gavrić moved abroad in 2012 to play in Poland and later played for clubs in Cyprus, Hungary, Bosnia and Herzegovina and Iceland.

References

External links

1989 births
Living people
People from Osijek
Association football central defenders
Croatian footballers
NK Osijek players
Widzew Łódź players
Enosis Neon Paralimni FC players
Dunaújváros PASE players
FK Velež Mostar players
Knattspyrnufélagið Fram players
Þór Akureyri players
NK BSK Bijelo Brdo players
Croatian Football League players
Ekstraklasa players
Cypriot First Division players
Nemzeti Bajnokság I players
Premier League of Bosnia and Herzegovina players
1. deild karla players
First Football League (Croatia) players
Croatian expatriate footballers
Expatriate footballers in Poland
Expatriate footballers in Cyprus
Expatriate footballers in Hungary
Expatriate footballers in Bosnia and Herzegovina
Expatriate footballers in Iceland
Croatian expatriate sportspeople in Poland
Croatian expatriate sportspeople in Cyprus
Croatian expatriate sportspeople in Hungary
Croatian expatriate sportspeople in Bosnia and Herzegovina
Croatian expatriate sportspeople in Iceland